is a Japanese men's former athlete of artistic gymnastics (AG). Born in Yokohama, Kanagawa, he, a graduate of Kishine High School, joined the Nippon Sport Science University (Nittaidai). Shirai took the team gold, and a bronze on individual vault with the Japanese men's AG (MAG) national team at the 2016 Summer Olympics (OG) in Rio de Janeiro while more major wins were from the World Championships (WC).

Early life
Like the older brothers, Shirai began gymnastics with parents Masaki and Norimi, first coaches and home club owners. Shirai said, "For as long as I can remember, I was a gym rat." Instead of paying day care, parents took him to their work. Practicing a six-hour session 5–7 days per week, Shirai attended regular school, which was atypical for an elite athlete. After high school in March 2015, he was accepted to attend/represent new home club of Nittaidai on the southern Tokyo border where Japan's other athletes in both men and women’s AG (WAG) trained too, including mentor Kōhei Uchimura.

Career

Six eponyms, three each on floor exercise (FX) and vault (VT), were named after Shirai as he was the first to perform all successfully at one international major tournament. He was the face of Japanese MAG national team in 2013–2018 until injury halted to later end career. Shirai retired on June 16, 2021, after not making the 2020 Summer Olympics in Tokyo.

2013 

Barely 17, Shirai was the youngest man participating in the 2013 AG WC. On FX, he qualified first with a 16.233, 0.633 above next highest scorer, Brazil's Diego Hypólito. Shirai became the youngest ever men's world FX champion then too. “Historic” 22¼-twist routine’s 7.4 difficulty score (D-score) won him first major at only 17 years, 1 month and 11 days old. Shirai’s 16.000 final score got 0.4 win-margin over American runner-up Jacob Dalton. Newscaster Tim Daggett declared live on-air that "there is no way Shirai doesn't win this" just before Shirai began his final FX routine where he "twisted his way to first gold medal". On VT, Shirai was again ranked on top in qualifying, but only managed to place fourth in finals.

Three of Shirai's six eponymous skills for MAG were officially verified here in Antwerp, Belgium. He managed to execute the Shirai or Shirai-Kim on VT (Yurchenko—all vault skills with round off [RO]–back handspring [BH] entries, originated by Soviet Natalia Yurchenko over Moscow event in 1982—triple full or triple-twisting Yurchenko [TTY]), Shirai or Shirai-Nguyen on FX (quadruple-twisting [back] layout backwards), and Shirai 2 on FX or triple-twisting (front) layout forwards.

2014 

Shirai took silver for Japan's team at the 2014 World Championships in Nanning—only 0.1 behind champion/host China. He made individual FX and VT finals again. On FX, despite having much larger D-score, he struggled with the execution score (E-score). In his third pass, an out-of-bound step resulted in a 0.1 penalty that cost him the gold, just 0.017 behind Russia's Denis Ablyazin. On VT, Shirai had top E-scores, but low difficulty on second vault dragged him down to fourth.

2015 

At the 2015 World Championships in Glasgow, MAG national team of Japan with Shirai won all-around (AA) title in team finals for first time since 1978. His score on floor exercise was the highest of the whole tournament, and also only one to value above 16.000 points. In individual event finals, Shirai got into both floor exercise and vault, winning the former and placing seventh in the latter. His floor routine with a 7.6 difficulty was at least 0.8 higher than the rest. These high scores were due to high connection bonuses of various skills/combinations with passes ending blind facing forwards, risking his combination lines. He also started competing "double somersault" (two revolutions) skills, and doing so with consistency. 

Over December’s Toyota Cup, Shirai verified his fourth eponym for MAG, the Shirai 3 on FX or a “triple-double” straight. The extremely-high-D-score skill let him become one of the men's gymnasts, who originated one of just four eponymous skills with then top H (0.8) D-score for MAG until their next new top I (0.9) was created to help score future hardest skills.

2016

2016 Summer Olympics 
At 19 years, 11 months and 15 days old, Shirai became Japan's youngest and only teen male gymnast ever to win Olympic gold after Japanese men’s squad claimed team gold in the team AA (TAA) finals. His contributions of 16.133 on floor exercise with 15.633 on vault respectively were apparatuses’ top values at the entire event.

In the FX finals, the two-time and reigning world champion on FX was the overwhelming favourite due to an extremely difficult routine, and usually excellent E-scores, but on this occasion, Shirai got problems with landings in three of the six passes. In separate interviews after the competition, Shirai with American Sam Mikulak, who was top qualifier ending up last, expressed disappointment with sportsmanship of audiences, whose booing/jeering grew louder and more hostile during non-Brazilian routines as the event went on. Max Whitlock of Great Britain was somewhat an unexpected gold medallist who avoided crowd input due to early draw of final routine.

In the VT finals, Shirai successfully originated the one new VT with top score of the entire competition, posting a 15.833 in first attempt, and his decision to compete a much easier second VT with low 5.6 D-score reduced value enough to tie Romanian Marian Drăgulescu for third highest total. Shirai won bronze ahead in tiebreak by posting VT with top execution among ones already scored. Shirai verified his second VT, and fifth overall eponym for MAG, the Shirai 2 on VT or Yurchenko 3½ twist.

2017 

In February, Shirai part of Team Japan at the Melbourne World Cup took individual FX, VT and the horizontal bar or high bar (HB) golds, parallel bars (PB) silver, and tenth on still rings (SR). At meet too, he verified his sixth eponym for MAG, the Shirai 3 on VT or Scherbo double full, with body governing all competitive gymnastics, International Gymnastics Federation (FIG), in the Code of Points (CoP) as male gymnast with most eponyms, and second then only to Russian Svetlana Khorkina's 9. 

At the 2017 AG WC, Shirai qualified for individual AA (IAA), FX and VT finals, medalling on every event. On the IAA, he won bronze with an 86.431, just 0.017 behind silver medallist Lin Chaopan. On FX, Shirai defended his title with a 1.100 over 2nd-ranked Artem Dolgopyat. On VT, Shirai won gold with tiniest margin of 0.001 over runner-up Igor Radivilov, plus favourite Yang Hak Seon withdrawing due to hamstring injury. MAG also activated new top I (0.9) D-score then with the Miyachi on HB.

2018 

In March 2018, Shirai competed at the American Cup in Hoffman Estates, Illinois. In spite of being the competition’s favourite, he only placed sixth due to a few errors and falls on HB and pommel horse (PH) while also underperformed own famously difficult FX routine. Shirai recovered by winning the Tokyo World Cup a month later.

In a series of domestic competitions being held locally between April and August, Shirai won IAA silver medals at the All-Japan Championships and NHK Trophy, and took the All-Japan Student Championships. Shirai was also able to win an individual gold medal on FX with silver medal on VT at the All-Japan Event Championships.

At the World Championships in Doha, Japan just secured the bronze on the TAA event with senior members like Kōhei Uchimura and Yusuke Tanaka acknowledging the team was slowed by injuries. Shirai was not in-form, simplifying some skills of many events—noticed most on FX. With resulting lower D-scores, he was unable to defend any of the medals from 2017, but of all results on his individual events, Shirai still managed to win silver on FX and bronze on VT, and rank seventh on the AA.

2019 

On April 7, 2019, Shirai joined competitive circuit this year at the FIG Individual All-Around World Cup 2019, or 2019 Tokyo World Cup in Tokyo, Japan. Like 2018, he was supposed to start his season off at the 2019 American Cup, but withdrew to treat left ankle injury, which was sustained about a week before he began travelling. Due to the injury, Shirai simplified certain skills in his routines for the competition here in Tokyo, which became especially noticeable when he performed on floor—his strongest signature event—as he recycled, using portions of his past routines. Changes included starting his floor routine with a RO–BH–3½ twist–punch double twist opening pass instead of the Shirai 3, one of two hardest skills on floor for men then, and also only a triple full final pass instead of the Shirai, his infamous quad twist. Shirai ultimately failed to defend his gold medal from last year, but did manage to capture bronze with the combined total of 82.964, despite still recovering from injury. The 2018 bronze medallist, Sam Mikulak of the United States (86.599), improved his standings, and won gold. Japan's Wataru Tanigawa (85.665) defended his silver. Ex-gymnast analyst Tim Daggett said, “(M)an, myth, legend ... capable of doing ... many things ... people thought were ... literally impossible before Shirai did them.”

On April 26–28, 2019, Shirai competed at the 2019 All-Japan AA Championships, one of two closely-hosted-only-IAA meets in Chofu, Tokyo metro, Japan, and made the event finals in 22nd place, but finished 30th. Shirai also only managed one top-three score for any apparatus, and second highest for floor (14.533) behind Kazuki Minami (14.633), who just competed on floor. This event's respective gold, silver and bronze medallists—Kakeru Tanigawa with a combined score of 84.699, Kazuma Kaya with a combined score of 84.664, and Kazuyuki Takeda with a combined score of 84.498—had Tanigawa managing the second highest score for pommel horse while Takeda had achieved the third highest for still rings too. After assessing their winning scores, it shows there is much to be desired in being able to post numbers that are above average for every apparatus. Shirai's remaining scores in that final—12.900 on pommel horse, 12.800 on still rings, 14.166 on vault, 13.733 on parallel bars, 11.300 on the horizontal bar, and 79.432 for the total AA combined score. Injury had persisted to adversely affect the recent competition performances, and thus reflected in the results. Event number differences between top apparatus scores and Shirai's were particularly wide on pommel horse, still rings and the horizontal bar.

On May 18–19, 2019, Shirai competed at the 2019 NHK Trophy in Chofu, Tokyo metro, Japan, repeating his 2018 participation in the IAA-only event. Due to lingering injury issues with the left ankle, he was unable to perform as well in the competition in comparison to most others, which would also include his performance here last year. Shirai placed 23rd with a 243.794 combined score. He was unable to achieve a top three score on any of the apparatuses, not even on his signatures of floor or vault. Shirai's scores on each respective apparatus were 14.500 on floor, 12.533 on pommel horse, 12.800 on still rings, 14.566 on vault, 14.066 on parallel bars, and 13.066 on high bar. Kakeru Tanigawa (254.363), Wataru Tanigawa (254.128) and Kazuma Kaya (254.126), who won the gold, silver and bronze, did not manage to score too, if at all, more than only one of the top three numbers on any apparatus, which may also indicate that none of the 2019 gymnasts was able to do particularly well that year at the competition. Kakeru Tanigawa was only able to score the second highest number (14.733) on floor, Wataru Tanigawa was also only able to score the third highest (14.866) on vault, and similar to Shirai, Kazuma Kaya likewise did not manage to post a top three number on any of his apparatuses at that event too.

On June 21–23, 2019, Shirai competed at the 2019 All-Japan Apparatus Championships in Takasaki, Japan, hoping he would do well enough to secure a spot on the Japanese men’s national team and compete as part of the next world championships held in the autumn of 2019. It was ultimately not meant to be his season though. Shirai qualified for three individual event finals, which were floor exercise, vault and the horizontal bar, ranking second, fourth and sixth respectively. In such finals, he proceeded to finish in third (14.900), fifth (14.433) and eighth (11.200) place respectively for each of these apparatuses too. Ranking ahead of Shirai on floor exercise were Kazuki Minami with a total score of 15.033, and Naoto Hayasaka with a total score of 15.000. Their top finisher on vault was Keitoro Okubo, posting the average combined score of 15.233, and the winner of the horizontal bar was Hirohito Kahama with a total score of 14.766. Shirai's floor D-score numbers had remained on top among all the finalists. However, his execution needed some additional work, and could have been cleaner, which was thus reflected on the routine's E-score. Shirai's vault D-score values were comparatively lesser—only one with the lowest 5.2—and needed higher base numbers before he could seriously challenge the top vaulters.

In 2019, for the first time since Shirai's competition-debut at the 2013 AG WC, he did not make the Japanese men's national team, and so got excluded to compete at the 2019 Artistic Gymnastics World Championships in Stuttgart, Germany, on October 4–13, 2019. Shirai's 2019 performances at competition were noticeably slowed down by a stubborn injury to that nagging left ankle, which resulted in his inability to compete optimally during the 2019 All-Japan Apparatus Championships when his results then and at the 2019 NHK Trophy decided which athletes joined the Japanese national team at the 2019 AG WC. His best chance was to get one of two spots available to Japan's individual men, namely for one or both of Shirai's signature events, FX and/or VT, but he only managed to place 3rd and 5th on individual FX and VT, which made him not qualify for the WC, and thus unable to defend the 2018 world medals. As Shirai was not the only high-profile absentee since Kōhei Uchimura was missing due to injuries too, Japanese men competed a fairly inexperienced squad at 2019's AG WC, where men's competition was dominated by other nations. Shirai worked hard to return to competition form after an extended period of time to try and recover from various injuries. Hence, he was very rusty on all apparatuses.

On December 14–15, 2019, Shirai again competed at the local 2019 Toyota International Cup (or Gymnastics Competition) in Aichi, Japan, from a last four years' win streak, in which Shirai had won each individual floor event before then (2015–2018), and the individual vault event in three past successive seasons (2015–2017) too. He did not compete vault in 2019 due to what ended up being the start of some rather stubborn ankle injuries to truly begin affecting performance level of competition. Injuries extending into 2019, Shirai still qualified first on floor and second on vault for the respective finals, but did not compete, withdrawing from all events at the end.

2020/2021 

On December 10–13, 2020, now postgraduate at Nittaidai, Shirai competed again at the 2020 All-Japan Championships in Takasaki, Japan, but not as well as in past years, placing only 18th and fourth on individual AA (167.196) and FX (15.166). Local national AG federation repurposed the event as another Olympic-qualifying one as officials chose the most in-form roster nearest to start of one COVID-affected 2020 Summer Olympics in Tokyo that was postponed until next summer with team of six men—four on the TAA event with team bronze at 2018's AG WC, where Shirai contributed on FX, VT and HB to team's total, plus two more on individual events. Due to public health issues of the COVID-19 pandemic, the 2020 Summer Olympics in Tokyo were delayed by one year until July 23–August 8, 2021. Our epidemic put off and/or cancelled many Olympic-qualifying meets too. In 2020, Shirai reluctantly began pondering retirement because of persistent injuries, but returned early 2021 to compete at the 2021 All-Japan Championships, still hoping to make the home OG. After failing to qualify, he announced his immediate retirement from AG on June 16, 2021, also missing him the 2021 AG WC hosted by a local replacement city, Kitakyushu. Shirai left behind his legacy of 13 major medals, and six eponyms.

Competitive history

Eponymous skills
Shirai got official credit in 6 original skill names. Current 2022–2024 quad's D-scores below held up since competing last in the FIG's earlier 2017–2021 CoP for MAG:

 

Japan's Takahiro Goshima had progressed the front layout 3 to 3½ twist, or Shirai 2 to Goshima on floor, with G (0.7) D-score at the 2017 Stuttgart Team Challenge. While the Shirai on vault got success competing since 2015 by other athletes like Briton Max Whitlock and China’s Zhang Chenglong, Shirai always topped E-scores. Succeeding Kazuhito Tanaka on Japanese men’s 2012 Olympic team in 2016, still only Shirai was ever successful competing 4 of the 6 eponyms through 2021 quad. Shirai originated the Shirai 2 on vault at the 2016 Summer Olympics in Rio de Janeiro, one skill nobody through 2017–2021 quad managed since to compete it again.

Miscellaneous
In October 2017 with the 2017 AG WC just taken place in Montreal, Canada, one social media video showed Shirai’s highly competent execution of the Mustafina on floor, or triple Y-turn, with E (0.5) difficulty in the 2017–2021 CoP for WAG that was already officially named after Russia's gymnast Aliya Mustafina. Shirai was then also compared completing additional skills on even more WAG apparatuses, such as his delivery of partial routine on uneven bars. Another clip was posted and compared in December 2018 of Shirai completing compatriot Mai Murakami's entire competitive floor routine to music, including her hardest skills (some not even pre-scored to work within MAG) such as the Gomez on floor, or quadruple turn with free leg below horizontal, by Elena Gómez of Spain, who completed skill at the 2002 AG WC, it is another turn that the FIG also assigned similar difficulty value of E (0.5) for WAG in 2017–2021 quad. With Shirai's knowledge, there has been another compilation video then shared by his fans showing Shirai in training skills, which could potentially become any future arsenal of possible advanced original skills in competition on floor and vault, including also a "RO–BH–4½ twist punch ½ or full" on floor with "½ on–3½ off" on vault.

See also
Japan men's national gymnastics team

References

External links

Shirai (FloorEx) at gymnaflash.com
Shirai/Kim (Vault) at gymnaflash.com

1996 births
Living people
People from Yokohama
Medalists at the World Artistic Gymnastics Championships
Japanese male artistic gymnasts
Olympic gymnasts of Japan
Gymnasts at the 2016 Summer Olympics
Olympic gold medalists for Japan
Olympic bronze medalists for Japan
Olympic medalists in gymnastics
Medalists at the 2016 Summer Olympics
Originators of elements in artistic gymnastics
Nippon Sport Science University alumni
21st-century Japanese people